Cabezas is a small town in Bolivia, seat of Cabezas Municipality. In 2010 it had an estimated population of 1971.

Geography
The town is located in the middle of its municipality, on the southeastern edge of the Cordillera Oriental mountain range.

Climate

References

External links

Populated places in Santa Cruz Department (Bolivia)